Jikji is the abbreviated title of a Korean Buddhist document whose title can be translated to "Anthology of Great Buddhist Priests' Zen Teachings". Jikji Simche means, "If you look at a person's heart correctly through the Zen meditation, you will realize that the nature of the heart is the heart of Buddha.". Printed during the Goryeo Dynasty in 1377, it is the world's oldest extant book printed with movable metal type. UNESCO confirmed Jikji as the world's oldest metalloid type in September 2001 and includes it in the Memory of the World Programme.

Jikji was published in Heungdeok Temple in 1377, 78 years prior to Johannes Gutenberg's acclaimed "42-Line Bible" printed during the years 1452–1455. The greater part of the Jikji is now lost, and today only the last volume survives, and is kept at the Manuscrits Orientaux division of the National Library of France (BnF). The BnF has hosted a digital copy online.

Authorship 
Jikji was written by the Buddhist monk Baegun (1298–1374, Buddhist name Gyeonghan).

In May of 1351, Baegun sought the teachings of Chinese Buddhist Master Seok-ok. After receiving the first folume of Bulgyeongjisimcheyojeol from Seok-ok, he began practicing Buddhist teachings. Baegun was also taught by the Indian high priest Jigonghwasang.

He later served as the chief priest of Anguksa and Shingwangsa temples in Haeju, Hwanghae Province, and was published in two volumes in Seongbulsan in 1372.

Baegun wrote and edited Jikji at Chwiamsa Temple in Yeoju in 1374, where he lived until death.

Contents 
Baegun compiled it as a guide for students of Buddhism, then Korea's national religion under the Goryeo Dynasty (918–1392).

The text propounds on the essentials of Seon, the predecessor to Japan's Zen Buddhism.

The Jikji consists of two volumes. The metal-print Jikji that was published in Heungdeok Temple is kept in the Manuscrits Orientaux division of the National Library of France, with the first page of the last volume (Book 1 in Chapter 38) torn off. A wood-carving print of Jikji published in Chwiamsa Temple contains the complete two volumes. This is kept in the National Library of Korea and Jangsagak and Bulgap temples as well as in the Academy of Korean Studies.

Printing 

On the last page of Jikji is recorded details of its publication, indicating that it was published in the 3rd Year of King U (July 1377) by metal type at Heungdeok temple in Cheongju. The Jikji originally consisted of two volumes totaling 307 chapters, but the first volume of the metal printed version is no longer extant.

There is a record indicating that in 1377 Baegun's students, priests Seoksan and Daldam, helped in the publication of Jikji by using moveable metal type and the priestess Myodeok contributed her efforts as well.

Although made using movable type, Jikji used different printing methods from Johannes Gutenberg.

The surviving metal type's dimensions are 24.6 × 17.0 cm. Its paper is very slight and white. The whole text is doubly folded very slightly. The cover looks re-made. The title of Jikji also seems to be written with an Indian ink after the original. The cover on the surviving volume of the metal type edition records in French "The oldest known Korean book printed with molded type, with 1377 as date", written by Maurice Courant.

The lines are not straight, but askew. The difference of the thickness of ink color shown on drawn letter paper is large, and spots often occur. Even some characters, such as 'day' (日) or 'one' (一), are written reversely, while other letters are not printed out completely. The same typed letters are not shown on the same paper, but the same typed letters appear on other leaves. There are also blurs and spots around the characters.

Rediscovery 
The metal-printed Jikji became known to the world in 1901 through its inclusion in the appendix of the Hanguk Seoji, compiled by the French Sinologist and scholar of Korea, Maurice Courant (1865–1935). In 1972 the Jikji was displayed in Paris during the "International Book Year" hosted by the National Library of France, gaining it worldwide attention for the first time. The book was "rediscovered" by Dr. Park Byeongseon who was working as a librarian in the National Library of France. Dr. Park died in 2011.

The Jikji was printed using metal print in Heungdeok Temple outside Cheongjumok in July 1377, a fact recorded in its postscript. The fact that it was printed in Heungdeok Temple in Uncheondong, Cheongju, was confirmed when Cheongju University excavated the Heungdeok Temple site in 1985.

Heungdeok Temple was rebuilt in March 1992. In 1992, the Early Printing Museum of Cheongju was opened, and it took the Jikji as its central theme from 2000.

Only the final volume of the Jikji is preserved by the Manuscrits Orientaux department of the National Library of France.

On September 4, 2001, the Jikji was formally added to UNESCO's Memory of the World. The Jikji Memory of the World Prize was created in 2004 to commemorate the creation of the Jikji.

Restoration 
The restoration process of the lower volume of Jikji was completed in 2013, restoring pages 2 to 14 by January of 2012 and pages 15 to 29 in January of 2013. In March of 2013, the Cheongju Early Printing Museum commissioned the Humanities Research Institute at Kyungpook National University to research further restoration processes to complete a full restoration of the two volumes of Jikji.

The completed restoration of the Jikji metal movable type was revealed at its Metal Type Casting Training Center, having successfully replicated the 31,200 characters in the upper and lower volumes of Jikji with a total of 78 plates engraved with 400 characters per plate. This restoration work, done by expert Im In-ho, was done by reproducing the printed type of Jikji using the wax casting method that was used widely at the time of Jikji's original creation.

The wax casting method engraves letters by attaching the letters to beeswax that were procured by heating honeycomb. A mold of the letter is then made by wrapping it with soil and pouring molten iron into the spaces where the wax has melted.

Because only one incomplete copy of the metal type printed Jikji remains, missing information was filled in by referring to the woodblock print version of Jikji, published a year after the metal type printed version. The new restoration then now includes the page of the lower volume that was lost in the copy at the French National Library. The typeface replicates the type of Jabidoryangchambeophae, which is known to have been produced at Heungdeoksa Temple in Cheongju around the same time period. Characters not found in the Jabidoryangchambeophae were created by combining strokes as printed in the lower volumes of Jikji.

In total, Cheongju city invested a total of ₩1.81 billion(~$1.5 million) on the Goryeo era metal type restoration project from 2011 to 2016.

Controversy 
Towards the end of the Joseon Dynasty, French diplomat Victor Collin de Plancy bought the second volume of the Jikji in Seoul and took it to France, where it is now kept at the National Library of France in Paris.

In May 1886, Korea and France concluded a treaty of defense and commerce, and as a result in 1887 official diplomatic relations were entered into by the treaty's official ratification by Kim Yunsik (1835–1922) and Victor Emile Marie Joseph Collin de Plancy. Plancy, who had majored in law in France and went on to study Chinese, had served for six years as translator at the French Legation in China, between 1877 and 1883. In 1888 he went to Seoul as the first French consul to Korea, staying until 1891. During his extended residence in Korea, first as consul and then again as full diplomatic minister from 1896–1906, Victor Collin de Plancy collected Korean ceramics and old books. He let Kulang, who had moved to Seoul as his official secretary, classify them.

Although the channels through which Plancy collected his works are not clearly known, he seems to have collected them primarily during the early 1900s. Most of the old books Plancy collected in Korea went to the National Library of France at an auction in 1911, while the metal-printed Jikji was purchased in that same year for 180 francs by Henri Véver, a well-known jewel merchant and old book collector, who in turn donated it to the French National Library in his will.

The right of ownership remains disputed, with the French National Library maintaining that the Jikji should remain in France, while Korean activists argue it should belong to Korea. The National Library of France says that as an important historical artifact of all mankind, the Jikji should remain in France as it represents a common, worldwide heritage, and does not belong to any one country. In addition, they claim the Jikji would be better preserved and displayed in France because of the prestige and resources the Library possesses. On the other hand, Korean organizations claim that it should belong to its country of origin and that it carries historical significance for the Korean people.
The Committee to Bring Jikji Back to Korea led by American Richard Pennington is one such organization in Seoul, Korea that is working to repatriate the Jikji back to Korea from France.
The French President François Mitterrand promised to investigate ways to return various Korean books including the Jikji, should the French high-speed rail technology be exported to Korea. From April to June 2011, 297 volumes with 191 different Uigwes of the Kyujanggak (Oegyujanggak), were shipped back in four separate installments and subsequently kept at the National Museum of Korea. However, Jikji was not included, following opposition in France, including a protest lodged by the librarians at the National Library.

See also 
 Movable type
 History of typography in East Asia
 Korean Buddhism
 National Library of France
 Gutenberg Bible
 History of Korea
 Jikji prize
 Diamond Sutra – earliest dated example of block printing

References

External links 

 Digitized Jikji by the BnF
 Description of the Jikji from BAM the BnF Archives and manuscripts online catalogue of the BnF

Goryeo works
Korean Buddhist texts
Science and technology in Korea
Mahayana texts
Bibliothèque nationale de France collections
Memory of the World Register
1370s books
Buddhist commentaries